Ajamila (Sanskrit: अजामिल,) is the main character of a story in canto 6 of the Bhagavata Purana. In Hinduism, the story of Ajamila is used to illustrate that by uttering God's divine name, there is hope for even the sinful to be redeemed from their propensity to commit sins.

Legend
In the city of Kānyakubja (modern-day Kannauj), there lived a Brahmana called Ajamila. One day, this reticent and humble Brahmana, who was obedient to his father, went to the forest to collect fruits, flowers, sticks for sacrificial fire, and kusha grass. On his way back, he chanced upon a passionate harlot, intoxicated, who was singing with her sari knot untied. Despite his efforts to control himself, he was unable to resist his temptation to claim her for himself. Infatuated, he married this Dasi (a female member of the servant class) woman by setting aside his Brahmana wife hailing from a good family, and got polluted through his association with her. He also neglected the Vedic way of life that a Brahmana was expected to adhere to. He resorted to a life of crime for supporting his family, holding captives for ransom, gambling, committing frauds, and thefts. He had ten children by this woman, the youngest of whom was named Narayana, who was his favourite. After a period of eighty-eight years, on his deathbed, he saw the Yamadutas, three extremely terrible male figures with wry faces and holding nooses in their hands, who had come to take his soul. Greatly frightened, he called out to his son, Narayana. Hearing the name of their lord invoked, the Vishnudutas, the servants of Vishnu, appeared to rescue him from the clutches of hell. The Vishnudutas and the Yamadutas engaged in a dialogue regarding the nature of righteousness and punishment, and brought the Brahmana before Yama for arbitration. 

The Vishnudutas explained that the Shastras state that the mere utterance or the recitation of the name of Vishnu, even if taken to denote another person, or in a friendly joke, or as an insertion during the recitation of a song, or even as an apparent insult, completely annihilates all the sins of the one who utters it. Ajamila, who witnessed the exchange between the beings, fell into remorse, announcing that he had indeed led a vile life and unworthy of his Brahminhood, and would henceforth lose his sense of self in his service to Vishnu. By this manner, the Brahmana Ajamila, who had neglected his duties and led a sinful life, was able to achieve moksha, and attain Vaikuntha.

See also 
 Markandeya
 Gajendra
 Prahlada

References

 Characters in the Bhagavata Purana